The Marxist–Leninist Party of Quebec (PMLQ) is a Marxist–Leninist and sovereigntist communist party in Quebec, Canada. The PMLQ is the Quebec branch of the anti-revisionist Communist Party of Canada (Marxist–Leninist).

However, the  refused to join the UFP, and ran candidates in the 2003, 2007, 2008 and 2012 Quebec elections.

The leader of the PMLQ is Pierre Chénier.

Election results

See also 
 Communism in Quebec

External links 
 Parti marxiste-léniniste du Québec website
 National Assembly historical information
 La Politique québécoise sur le Web

Communism in Quebec
Communist Party of Canada (Marxist–Leninist)
Far-left politics in Canada
Provincial political parties in Quebec
Political parties established in 1970
Organizations based in Montreal
Hoxhaist parties
1970 establishments in Quebec
Secessionist organizations in Canada
Pro-independence parties
Quebec sovereignty movement
Republicanism in Canada